A list of animated television series first aired in 2002.

See also
 List of animated feature films of 2002
 List of Japanese animation television series of 2002

References

Television series
Animated series
2002
2002
2002-related lists